West Paducah is an unincorporated community in McCracken County, Kentucky, United States.  Its elevation is 361 feet (110 m).

History
The Heath High School shooting occurred at Heath High School in West Paducah on Monday, December 1, 1997. Fourteen-year-old Michael Carneal opened fire on a group of praying students, killing three and injuring five more.

Government and infrastructure
The United States Postal Service operates the West Paducah Post Office along U.S. Route 60.

West Paducah is also the location of National Weather Service forecast office that serves Paducah and its surrounding area.

Education
McCracken County Public Schools operates public schools. Schools include Heath Elementary School, Heath Middle School, and
Heath High School.

Notable natives
Julian Carroll, Governor of Kentucky

Climate
The climate in this area is characterized by hot, humid summers and generally mild to cool winters.  According to the Köppen Climate Classification system, West Paducah has a humid subtropical climate, abbreviated "Cfa" on climate maps.

References

Unincorporated communities in McCracken County, Kentucky
Unincorporated communities in Kentucky